Way Back Home is an album by guitarist Phil Keaggy, released in 1986 on Pan Pacific Records. A heavily revised reissue of the album — with a different cover, a different track order, new songs, one original track omitted, and most other tracks modified — was released in 1994 on Sparrow Records.

Track listing
All songs were written by Phil Keaggy, unless otherwise noted.

1986 version
 "Way Back Home" (4:19)
 "Here and Now" (2:44)
 "A New Star" (3:32)
 "Maker of the Universe" (music by Keaggy, words by F. W. Pitt) (3:10)
 "Once I Prayed" (music by Keaggy, words by Helen McDowell) (3:10)
 "Let Everything Else Go" (5:51) (different than the previously released version on Town to Town album)
 "Noah's Song" (4:01)
 "The Reunion" (5:59) (also released, in a nearly identical version, on The Wind and the Wheat album, the following year)
 "Olivia" (3:21)
 "Be in Time" (music by Keaggy, Words by anonymous and Keaggy) (4:18)
 "In Every Need" (music by Keaggy, Words Samuel Longfellow and anonymous) (4:54)
  - does not appear on 1994 version

1994 version
 "Way Back Home" (4:19)
 "A New Star" (3:35)
 "Father-Daughter Harmony" (Alicia and Phil Keaggy) (4:25)
 "It Could Have Been Me" (music by Keaggy, Words by Sheila Walsh) (5:11)
 "In Every Need" (music by Keaggy, words Samuel Longfellow and anonymous) (4:57)
 "She's a Dancer" (2:59)
 "Let Everything Else Go" (4:54)
 "Olivia" (3:26)
 "Once I Prayed" (music by Keaggy, words by Helen McDowell) (3:14)
 "Noah's Song" (4:01)
 "Maker of the Universe" (music by Keaggy, words by F. W. Pitt) (3:11)
 "Be in Time" (music by Keaggy, words by anonymous and Keaggy) (4:23)
 "Here and Now" (2:40)
 "The 50th" (music by Keaggy and traditional) (9:19)
  - new song

Differences in songs between versions
Although all but one of the songs from the original 1986 version also appear on the 1994 version, most of them were revised in some way. Keaggy recorded new vocals for the majority of them, and some had changes in the instrumentation.
 "Here and Now" – String sounds from the original version were removed for the 1994 version, and the 1994 version is faded slightly early.
 "A New Star" – 1994 version includes new keyboard sounds and replaces the original soprano sax part with a penny whistle part.
 "Maker of the Universe" – String sounds from the original version were removed for the 1994 version.
 "Let Everything Else Go" – 1994 version is faded out about a minute earlier than the original version.
 "Noah's Song" – String sounds from the original version were removed for the 1994 version.
 "In Every Need" – 1994 version has a brief section with no guitar, only bass.

Personnel 

 Phil Keaggy – guitars, vocals, electric bass, recorders
 Alex Acuña – drums
 Ken Lewis – drums, percussion
 Brad Dutz – percussion
 David Stone – string bass
 Jim Isaacs – oboe, English horn
 Jon Clarke – clarinet, soprano sax, oboe
 Blair Masters – keyboards
 Alicia Keaggy – vocals
 Olivia Keaggy – additional harmony
 Danny O'Lannerghty – string bass
 Allan Bradley – piano
 Ian McKinnell – cello
 John Walls Strings and Woodwinds arranged by Tom Howard
 String section – Pavel Farkus, Gail Cruz, R. F. Peterson, Ken Burwood-Hoy

Production
 Phil Keaggy – producer, arranger at Weddington Studio, North Hollywood, California; Whitefield Studios, Santa Ana California; Salt Mine Studios, Nashville, Tennessee; The Dugout, Nashville, Tennessee
 Bob Cotton – engineer (original tracks)
 Peter Hayden – engineer (original tracks)
 Thom Roy – engineer (original tracks)
 Eddie Keaggy – engineer (original tracks)
 Russ Long – remix, engineer
 Martin Woodlee – second engineer
 Ken Love – mastering at Mastermix
 Karen Philpott – art direction
 Sara Remke – design
 Ben Pearson – photography

References

1986 albums
1994 albums
Phil Keaggy albums